Genesis 1983–1998 is a box set of four studio albums by Genesis. It was released on 1 October 2007 in Europe & Japan by Virgin/EMI and on 20 November 2007 North America by Atlantic/Rhino. The 5-CD/5-DVD box set includes newly remixed versions of the albums Genesis, Invisible Touch, We Can't Dance, and ...Calling All Stations.... The fifth pair of discs includes B-side songs. Each bonus DVD features audio versions of the albums in 5.1 surround sound, as well as videos for songs from that album and its corresponding tour, new interviews, and photo galleries.

Audio formats
In the European and Japanese releases of this box set, the CDs are hybrid SACD/CDs. The SACD layer is a multichannel surround sound remix.

In the Canadian and U.S. releases of this box set, standard CDs with no SACD layer are included.

In all versions of the box set, the DVDs are DVD-Video format (not DVD-Audio), although they contain both audio and video tracks. These DVDs include three audio mixes:  DTS 5.1-channel surround sound, Dolby Digital 5.1-channel surround sound, and Dolby Digital stereo. The DTS surround sound is a slightly compressed version of the surround sound on the SACDs, and the Dolby surround sound is a slightly inferior quality to the DTS.

All of the audio tracks on these CDs were remixed in stereo and surround sound by producer Nick Davis.

The seven letters on the "Genesis" logo contain the album art from the following albums:
 The "G" is from We Can't Dance.
 The first "E" is from Genesis.
 The "N" is from ...Calling All Stations....
 The second "E" is from Invisible Touch.
 The first "S" is from We Can't Dance.
 The "I" is from ...Calling All Stations....
 The second "S" is from Invisible Touch.

Track listing

Genesis

CD

DVD

Invisible Touch

CD

DVD

We Can't Dance

CD

DVD

Calling All Stations

CD

DVD

Extra Tracks 1983 to 1998

CD

DVD

Personnel
Tony Banks – keyboards, background vocals
Mike Rutherford – guitars, bass
Phil Collins – drums, percussion, lead and backing vocals (except on Calling All Stations and tracks 6-8 of Extra Tracks 1983 To 1998)
Ray Wilson – lead vocals, backing vocals (on Calling All Stations and tracks 6-8 of Extra Tracks 1983 To 1998)

Additional personnel

Nir Zidkyahu – drums on all tracks of Calling All Stations except for tracks 4 (first half), 6, 8 and 9; drums on tracks 6-8 of Extra Tracks 1983 to 1998
Nick D'Virgilio – drums on Calling All Stations tracks 4 (first half), 6, 8 and 9

Formats
UK/EU Version:  CD/SACD hybrid + DVD (PAL)
US/Canadian Version: CD + DVD (NTSC)
Japanese Version:  CD/SACD hybrid + DVD (NTSC)

References

Albums produced by Hugh Padgham
Albums produced by Nick Davis (record producer)
Genesis (band) compilation albums
Genesis (band) video albums
2007 compilation albums
Atlantic Records compilation albums
Atlantic Records video albums
2007 video albums
Genesis (band) live albums
Live video albums
EMI Records compilation albums
EMI Records live albums
Atlantic Records live albums